A list of films produced in South Korea in 1979:

References

External links
1979 in South Korea

 1970-1979 at www.koreanfilm.org

1979
South Korean
1979 in South Korea